MTV Komedia was a Finnish television owned and operated by MTV3. It started broadcasting in December 2010. The channel closed on 31 March 2014.

External links
www.mtv3.fi

Defunct television channels in Finland
Television channels and stations established in 2010
Television channels and stations disestablished in 2014